Torodora is a genus of moths in the family Lecithoceridae. The genus was erected by Edward Meyrick in 1894.

Distribution and diversity
Torodora is an oriental genus and comprises more than 100 species.

Species

Former species
Torodora isomila (Meyrick, 1911)
Torodora ortilege (Meyrick, 1911)

References

 , 1894, Transactions of the Entomological Society of London 1894: 16
 , 2002: Taxonomic review of the genus Torodora Meyrick in Thailand, with descriptions of fifteen new species (Lepidoptera: Lecithoceridae). Insecta Koreana 19 (2): 147–166.
 , 2003: Three new species of Lecithoceridae (Lepidoptera) from Taiwan. Journal of Asia-Pacific Entomology 6 (1): 15–19. Full article: 
 , 2006: A taxonomic review of the subfamily Torodorinae (Lepidoptera: Lecithoceridae) of Vietnam, with descriptions of five new species. Journal of Asia-Pacific Entomology 9 (4): 327–337.
 , 2007: Three new species of Torodora Meyrick, 1894 from Thailand (Lepidoptera: Lecithoceridae). SHILAP Revista de Lepidopterología 35 (137): 23–28. Full article: .
 , 2008: A review of the Torodora recurvata species group in the Philippines, with descriptions of ten new species (Lepidoptera: Lecithoceridae), Entomological Science 11: 359–373.
 , 2008: Four new species of Torodora Meyrick and a new species of Antiochtha Meyrick from the Philippines (Lepidoptera: Lecithoceridae). Journal of Asia-Pacific Entomology 11 (2): 89–95.
 , 2010: Two new genera, Caveana gen. nov. and Triviola gen. nov., and two new Torodora species from Thailand (Lepidoptera: Lecithoceridae). Entomological Science 13 (2): 250–257. 
 , 2010: First Record of Torodora from Papua New Guinea, with the Description of a New Species (Lepidoptera: Gelechioidea: Lecithoceridae). Proceedings of the Entomological Society of Washington 112 (3): 404–409. .
 , 2000: Lecithoceridae (Lepidoptera) of Taiwan (III) Subfamily Torodorinae: genus Torodora Meyrick. Transactions of the Lepidopterological Society of Japan 51 (4): 287–297. Full article: .
  1997: A new species of the genus Torodora from Xizang Autonomous Region (Lepidoptera：Lecithoceridae). Acta Entomologica Sinica 40 (3): 303–304. Full article: .
  2010: Description of a new Torodora Meyrick, 1894 species from China (Lepidoptera: Lecithoceridae). SHILAP Revista de Lepidoptorologia 38 (149): 91–95. Full article: .

External links

 
Torodorinae
Moth genera